The Asia-Pacific region (or Asia Pacific Region) may refer to:

Asia-Pacific, a geographic designation
Asia-Pacific Scout Region (World Organization of the Scout Movement)
Pacific Rim, countries and cities located around the edge of the western Pacific Ocean